Nikita Shokhov (born 1988) is a visual artist and filmmaker in virtual environments. He received third prize in the World Press Photo award, Staged Portrait: Stories category in 2014.

Biography 

Nikita Shokhov, the son of Russian painter, art critic, and an associate professor of Tyumen State University Konstantin Shokhov, was born in Kamensk-Uralsky, USSR. Despite the inherited interest in visual arts, he initially studied in Ural State Law University in Ekaterinburg. Immediately after that he lost interest in the legal profession and decided to study photography and cinema. He joined photography club at the Metenkov House Museum of Photography, attended workshops led by a renowned photographer Sergey Rogozhkin, and cinematography classes at Sverdlovsk Film Studio. Thereafter he moved to Moscow to enroll in The Rodchenko Art School and continued his education at the documentary photography workshop under the guidance of Igor Mukhin. In late 2010th he continued his education at California Institute of the Arts and School of Visual Arts at Virginia Tech.

Art practice 

Shokhov works with both still and moving images. Throughout art projects, he explores the duality of body and mind, myth and reality, human nature, religions, history, and culture. He works in collaboration with his spouse Anna Evtiugina who takes roles of co-author, and producer, depending on a project.

Shokhov's photographs were published in The New York Times, The Guardian, Le Monde, Harper's Bazaar Art, l’Insensé, Openspace, Elle, Time Out and British Journal of Photography, L'Officiel Russia, L'Express, Courrier International, IL, China Newsweek, Calvert Journal, Colta, and YET magazine. He participated in numerous art festivals and biennales, including Manifesta 10 in Saint Petersburg, Moscow Biennale of Contemporary Art, and Photoquai in Paris.

Photography 

 The series "Moscow Nightlife" (2010–2015) is a study on human behavior. Shokhov spent several years documenting a demographically diverse range of Muscovites from hipsters to low class at different settings and different moments of their night out. Through Shokhov's sober eyes the partymakers appear similar to carnival revelers in Mikhail Bakhtin's philosophy works.
 Shokhov's thesis project at the Rodchenko Art School, the series "Rublevka" (2012–2013) was a visual research of a prestigious residential area of that name to the west of Moscow. Rublevka is where the residencies of nouveau riche are located and also the place with the highest social stratification in Russia. In his photo report, Shokhov captured the new elite, the ordinary inhabitants, and the guest workers to highlight the threatening gap between extremely rich and incredibly poor.
 The series "Black Sea" (2011–2012) created at several Black Sea resorts such as Sochi and Anapa was dedicated to Russian beach culture. It resembles Martin Parr's photobook The Last Resort (1986) that represented working-class vacationers in the UK, and photographs by Sergey Rogozhkin on Black Sea beaches in the 1980s
 In the series "Utrich", Shokhov combined documentary and staged photography methods to approach Biblical motives. It was produced at Utrish national park on the northern shore of the Black Sea that has been a popular spot among nudists since the 1980s. Vacationers from the nudist camps were invited as models.
 The series "Children Personal Space" (2014) was a research on living space of young people and the way they interact with it with surreal scenarios shot in routine environments.
 In the series "Sacred Procession" (2012–2014), Shokhov approached religious processions in provincial towns, photographed candidly, bringing an unedited report.

A number of Shokhov's projects were dedicated to the contemporary Russian character. He sampled the way of life of Russian people and their ties to national culture in the small towns of Bologoe (shot in 2014) and Pereslavl-Zalessky (shot in 2013), a Sep village in Udmurtia. In 2014, Shokhov took part in a large "Where Does the Motherland Begin?" national photographic project aimed to depict a variety of Russian traditions and overlapping of soviet and modern Russian culture.
 In the series "Scan" (2013–2016) Shokhov remained within the documentary tradition but went beyond the boundaries of direct photography. In that formal experiment, he used a slit-scan photography technique to capture 40 seconds of reality in one image using a view camera with a Better Light scanning back. Therefore, the moving objects, such as cars and people, undergo the process of plastic deformation while still objects such as architecture and landscapes appear as expected. Photographs of the "Scan" series portray processions, such as Mardi Gras in New Orleans, Saint Patrick's Day in Boston, New York, and Washington, Victory parade, and communist demonstration in Moscow and Velikoretsky Sacred Procession in Kirov Oblast. With the use of this artistic technique, Shokhov added a new visual metaphor to the mass gathering, where individuality becomes blurred and distorted.
 The series "Flaming Motors" was captured at the Gorky Automobile Plant (GAZ) in Nizhny Novgorod. The title refers to the figurative name, given to new Soviet plants at the time of mass industrialization. The series depicts industrial life through the prism of human-robot interaction. It also romanticizes the industrial buildings initially built for a solely functional reason and the cities that surround them.

Visual installations and virtual environments 

 "The Last March" (2017) was a video installation created in collaboration with Russian-American artist Naum Medovoy. The exhibition in Moscow Museum of Modern Art presented Medovoy's graphic works and a film produced in memory of Soviet soldiers that were classified as missing in action, and the prisoners of war who were declared "Traitors to the Motherland" and sent to labor camps and Gulag. Shokhov presented two works. His film combined fragments of Medovoy's film with recently recorded footage of present-day Moscow and New York to highlight the gap between values of the mid-century and the present time. The second installation provided a contemporary interpretation of Medovoy's diaries and sketchbooks with a focus on women identity, stereotyping, and the tensions of daily life for a woman.
 The project "Ice" (2015—2017) was an experimental film and immersive video installation by Shokhov, Andrey Kachalian, and Albina Mochryakova. It combined the features of narrative film, documentary film, and performance art. It explored concepts of carnivalesque, freedom, and physicality. The project was filmed at many nudist colonies at the Black Sea beaches of the Crimea peninsula with non-professional performers.
 "Klaxon" (2017–2020) is a virtual reality experience that addresses questions of race and gender. The script combined the play by J. William Howe that explored the gender identity and Shokhov's research on racial identity. The story unfolded around a black woman on the way to acceptance of her identity. The lead role was played by several actresses of different ages and races. The film was produced with a 360-degree camera in different locations, including Indiana University Bloomington, and New York City. Shokhov and Evtiugina aimed to facilitate cross-cultural dialogue and worked with a diverse team of Russian and American crew, artists and scholars. The cast followed Shokhov's guided improvisation method. The use of VR allows the audience to contemplate the memories and the reflections of the protagonist.

Awards
2014: Third prize, World Press Photo award, Staged Portrait: Stories category for his Utrich series
2015: Silver Camera Award (Children Personal Space series)
2019: Nova Art Award for the 360 degrees film Klaxon, in collaboration with Anna Evtiugina

Shows

Solo shows 

 2012 Empty Hills. The Space of Joy, Galerie Iragui, Moscow
 2012 Sochi. City of the Future Olympic Games, White Nights Festival, Perm
 2013 Black Sea Vacations (a Biennale “Fashion and Style in Photography event), Multimedia Art Museum, Moscow
 2014 Moscow Nightlife (Moscow Biennale of Photography event) Zurab Tsereteli Gallery, Moscow
 2015 Children: Personal Space, Gallery Peresvetov, Moscow
 2015 Sacred Procession (Baltic Biennial of Photography event), State Art Gallery, Kaliningrad
 2017 Ice (screening at Artdocfest film festival), Czech Cultural Center, Moscow.
 2017 The Last March (collaboration with Naum Medovoy), Moscow Museum of Modern Art, Moscow
 2017 Ice, Artdocfest, Moscow
 2020 Scan | Klaxon, 11.12 Gallery, Moscow

Notable group shows 

 2010 Self-image, Plates to Pixels Gallery, Portland, USA
 2011 Life in Motion, International Center of Photography, New York
 2012 The Stone Flower, National Centre for Contemporary Arts, Moscow
 2013 Stability. Ghosts, Random gallery, Moscow
 2013 Chernukha, RuArts gallery, Moscow
 2013 The Happy End, Multimedia Art Museum, Moscow
 2013 What is Behind This Curtain?, Random Gallery, Moscow
 2014 Twelve Thinking Photographers, Manifesta 10 parallel event, First Cadets' Corpus, St. Petersburg
 2014 Moscow. Barocco, 4th Moscow International Biennale for young art collateral event, Triumph Gallery, Moscow
 2014 Artistic Invention of Yourself and the Pure Enjoyment of Life and Love, Austrian Cultural Forum, Moscow
 2014 Moskovia. Research, All-Russian Decorative Art Museum, Moscow
 2014 Young, GUP Gallery, Amsterdam
 2014 Where Motherland Begins, Museum of History of Moscow, Moscow 
 2015 Borderlands, Gallery for Russian Arts and Design, London
 2015 Exhibition within the 5th Photoquai Biennale, Paris
 2015 Hope (The 6th Moscow Biennale event), Moscow
 2016 Ice (at Fada: House of Madness art show), The Watermill Center, Water Mill, New York
 2018 Scan (8th Tashkent International Biennale of Contemporary Art), Tashkent
 2019 Darling Angel (an annual CalArts School of Film/Video Showcase), Redcat, Los Angeles
 2019 Exhibition within the Anhydrite Biennale of Media Art, Germany
 2019 Klaxon (exhibition within the CYFEST-12 in collaboration with Anna Evtiugina), Saint Petersburg
 2020 CADAF Online

References

External links 
 
 Works on Gridchinhall

1988 births
Living people
Russian photographers